Mayr Facci (7 April 1927 – 11 March 2015) was a Brazilian basketball player. He competed in the men's tournament at the 1952 Summer Olympics and the 1956 Summer Olympics.

References

External links
 

1927 births
2015 deaths
Brazilian men's basketball players
1954 FIBA World Championship players
Olympic basketball players of Brazil
Basketball players at the 1952 Summer Olympics
Basketball players at the 1956 Summer Olympics
People from Catanduva
Medalists at the 1955 Pan American Games
Sportspeople from São Paulo (state)
Pan American Games medalists in basketball
Basketball players at the 1955 Pan American Games
Pan American Games bronze medalists for Brazil
21st-century Brazilian people
20th-century Brazilian people